"Goodness Gracious" is a 2014 song by Ellie Goulding.

Goodness Gracious may also refer to:
Goodness, Gracious, 2006 album by Blood Feathers
"Goodness Gracious", a 2001 song by The Lucksmiths, B-side of "Friendless Summer", re-released on Where Were We?
"Goodness Gracious", a song by Jim Bianco from Handsome Devil
"Goodness Gracious", a song by Kevin Gilbert from the album Thud

See also
Goodness Gracious Me (disambiguation)